Southwest Jiaotong University (SWJTU) is a national public research university in Chengdu, Sichuan, China. The university is affiliated with the Ministry of Education of China. It is also a national key university co-sponsored by the Ministry of Education, China Railway Corporation, Sichuan Provincial Government and Chengdu Municipal Government.

SWJTU was founded in 1896 and is one of China 's leading engineering universities. Known as the cradle of China's railway engineers and “the Cornell of the East,” SWJTU is the birthplace of China's modern education in transportation, mining and metallurgy, and civil engineering. Through its history, the university has adopted different names such as “Imperial Chinese Railway College,” “Tangshan Jiaotong University,” and “Tangshan Institute of Railway.”

SWJTU is consistently ranked as one of the top universities in China, placing 181-190 in The Times Higher Education Asia University Rankings 2016 and ranking 161 in The Times Higher Education BRICS & Emerging Economies 2016. It was included as one of the first universities into Double First Class University Plan and former Project 211. To date, SWJTU faculty and alumni have won 57 fellowships to the United States and China National Academy of Sciences. It is a Chinese state Double First Class University.

About SWJTU
The university was founded at Shanhaiguan, Hebei, in 1896, and it is currently located in Chengdu, Sichuan. The University has three campuses: the main Xipu campus, the Jiulidi campus in downtown Chengdu, and Emei campus about 90 miles to the southwest of the city snuggled at the foot of the Mount Emei, one of China's four sacred Buddhist mountains. The university offers programs at the graduate and undergraduate level to approximately 60,000 students.

Southwest Jiaotong University (SWJTU) was founded at Shanhaiguan in 1896, named then Imperial Chinese Railway College. It is one of the oldest universities in China majoring in engineering. In 1905, it was moved to Tangshan, Hebei Province, and was renamed Tangshan Chiao Tung University, Tangshan Railway Institute, and so on. In 1972, the university was removed to Emei, Sichuan province, and began to use its present name-Southwest Jiaotong University. In 1989, it was moved to Chengdu, and in 2002, the construction of a new campus covering an area of over 3,000 mu was started in Chengdu. With this, a new pattern of “one university, in two places, with three campuses” is coming into being.

Currently, the university has 18 schools, 3 departments and 2 divisions, with students totaling more than 38000, teachers and staff over 3900, which including full-time teachers about 1800, professors and associate professors about 1000, 3 CAS academicians and 2 CAE academicians. In addition, there are also 29 academicians from CAS and CAE who serve as part-time professors at the university's invitation. There are now 45 PHD programs, 95 master's degree accredit posts, 61 undergraduate majors and 7 post-doctorate research centers, 3 national basic scientific research and teaching talents training bases, 6 national key disciplines and 1 state key laboratory.

History

Historical Footprints 

Founded in 1896, Southwest Jiaotong University (SWJTU) was originally named Imperial Chinese Railway College at Shanhaiguan by Beiyang Railway Bureau. In 1900, due to the invasion of the allied forces of the eight imperialist powers, it was forced to shut down. And in 1905, it was relocated to Tangshan and renamed Tangshan Railway Institute. In 1906, it added the subject of mine and renamed Shanhaiguan College of Railway and Mining. In 1908, it was renamed Tangshan College of Railway and Mining, directly under the jurisdiction of the postal department of Qing Government, which was replaced in 1912 with the Ministry of Transport in Republic of China. Then the college was renamed Tangshan Railway Institute of the Ministry of Transport, under the direct jurisdiction of the Ministry of Transport. In 1913, it renamed Tangshan School of Technology under the order of the Ministry of Education and the Ministry of Transport. In 1921, the Ministry of Transport of Beiyang government founded Jiaotong University, with its headquarter in Beijing, and three branches in Beijing, Tangshan and Shanghai. The university was renamed Tangshan Institute of Jiaotong University. In 1922, the Ministry of Transport restructured Jiaotong University and divided it into Tangshan University and Nanyang University. The school was renamed as Tangshan University of the Ministry of Transport. In February 1928, Tangshan University was renamed Tangshan Jiaotong University under the instruction of Beiyang government. And in June, 1928, it was renamed the Second Jiaotong University after National Government's unifying South and South. In the same year, the Ministry of Transport restructured Jiaotong University and set its headquarter in Shanghai. The school was renamed Tangshan Civil Engineering Institute of Jiaotong University. In October, 1928, National Government founded Ministry of Railways, and the school was under its direct jurisdiction. In November, Jiaotong University was renamed Jiaotong University of the Ministry of Railways, with its headquarter in Shanghai, and its branches of Peiping Railway Management Institute and Tangshan Engineering Institute. The school was renamed Tangshan Engineering Institute of Jiaotong University.

After the Lu Gou Qiao Incident in 1937, the campus was occupied by the Japanese army. With the effort of staff and students, the university was re-established in Xiangtan, Hunan at the end of 1937. In March 1938, Peiping Railway Management Institute was merged into Tangshan Engineering Institute. In May, the university was moved to Yang Jiatan, Xiangxiang, Hunan. In 1938, Wuhan fell to enemy occupation, and the university was forced to move westward. In 1939, the university restarted classes in Pingyue city (Fuquan City nowadays) Guizhou. In July 1941, with the decision of Ministry of Education, the university was renamed as National Tangshan Engineering Institute of Jiaotong University, Peiping Railway Management Institute which aroused controversy within the university. Thus, in January 1942, Ministry of Education established National Jiaotong University, Guizhou, including Tangshan Engineering Institute and Peiping Railway Management Institute. In November 1944, owing to the occupation of Japanese army of Dushan Guizhou, the university was forced to remove to Bishan, Sichuan. After the Anti-Japanese War, in August 1946, with the decision of Ministry of Education, the university was renamed National Tangshan Engineering Institute, directly under Ministry of Education, and was moved back to its original site in Tangshan. In 1949, after the founding of the People's Republic of China, the university was taken over by Ministry of Railways of Central Military Commission. China Jiaotong University was established, with headquarter in Beijing, and branches of Tangshan Engineering Institute and Beijing Railway Management Institute. And the university was renamed Tangshan Engineering College of China Jiaotong University. In August 1950, the university was renamed as Tangshan Engineering College of Northern Jiaotong University. In 1952, with the Adjustment of Departments in Chinese Colleges, the major of Mining, Metallurgy, Chemicals, Architecture, Water Conservancy, Communication etc. were moved out, and the university was renamed Tangshan Railway Institute. In September 1964, the university was moved to Emei Sichuan, according to the decision of Ministry of Railways and national policies. In 1972, the university began to use its present name: Southwest Jiaotong University. In 1989, the headquarter was moved to Chengdu (with Emei as its branch, later a campus). In 2002 Xipu Campus was founded, thus a new pattern of “one university, in two places, with three campuses” is coming into being.

1896.05-1900.09 Imperial Chinese Railway College
1900.09-1905.05 (School Closure because of the invasion of Qing empire by the Eight-Nation Alliance) 
1905.10-1906.03 Tangshan Railway College, Imperial Railways of North China 
1906.04-1907.12 Tangshan Engineering & Mining College, Imperial Railways of North China 
1908.01-1912.12 Tangshan Engineering & Mining College (by the Ministry of Posts and Communications) 
1913.08-1921.07 Tangshan Engineering College 
1921.07-1922.09 Tangshan College, Chiao Tung University 
1922.09-1928.02 Tangshan University 
1928.02-1928.06 Tangshan Chiao Tung University 
1928.06-1928.08 The Second Chiao Tung University 
1928.09-1931.08 Tangshan Civil Engineering College, Chiao Tung University 
1931.09-1937.08 Tangshan Engineering College, Chiao Tung University 
1937.08-1942.01 Tangshan Engineering College, National Chiao Tung University 
1942.01-1946.08 Guizhou Division, National Chiao Tung University 
1946.08-1949.07 National Tangshan Engineering College 
1949.07-1950.08 Tangshan Engineering College, Jiaotong University of China 
1950.08-1952.05 Tangshan Engineering College, Northern Jiaotong University 
1952.05-1972.03 Tangshan Institute of Railway 
1972.03-present Southwest Jiaotong University

School Motto 
In 1928, after the establishment of national government, Jiaotong University was re-established by Ministry of Communication with headquarter in Shanghai. The name of the university then was Tangshan Civil Engineering College of Jiaotong University. On May 2, 1930, the school motto “Diligence, Ambition, Decisiveness, Loyalty” (竢实扬华 in Chinese) was brought out. On May 15, 1947, when Tangshan Engineering Institute (Southwest Jiaotong University) was celebrating its 51st anniversary, and the 42nd anniversary of the university re-establishment in Tangshan, the original school motto was reconfirmed as the motto of Tangshan Engineering Institute: “Diligence, Ambition, Decisiveness, Loyalty

School Spirit 
The origin of the spirit of “cultivating talents for the rejuvenation of Chinese nation”: in spring 1916, National Universities Students Performance Exhibition and Competition was held by Ministry of Education in Beijing. Our university won the first prize with the highest mark of 94. In Dec, besides awards, a horizontal inscribed board of “Si Shi Yang Hua” was awarded by Fan Yuanlian, the Minister of Education. “Si” means Wait; “Shi” has 3 meanings which include fruits, solidity, honesty and reality; “Yang” means raise and spread; and “Hua” means the abbreviation of China, the gorgeous and the beautiful. When combining the 4 characters together, it means waiting for the ripeness of the fruits, namely cultivating talents and at the same time to be more honest and practical in order to make contribution for the rejuvenation of Chinese nation. “Yang Hua” also has the meaning of abandoning vanity and pursuing the practical.

“Persevering in the betterment of individual merits” is the spirit concluded from the stormy university running experience. It comes from the sentence “As heaven’s movement is ever vigorous, so must a gentleman ceaselessly strive along” in Zhouyi. The sentence means the sun, the moon and the stars are in timeless motion, thus, “the heaven” is “vigorous”. Man should follow the example of the heaven, to be positive all the time. For Southwest Jiaotong University, it has 4 meanings: never stop, advance despite difficulties, self-perfection and fight our own way.

The spirit of “cultivating talents for the rejuvenation of Chinese nation, persevering in the betterment of individual merits” contains 4 meanings: first, to be “patriotic and ready to revitalize China”; second, “conscientious and careful, genuine and realistic”; third, “love the university as one’s own home and professional dedication”, the last, “forge ahead in a pioneering spirit and fight one’s own way”.

Schools and Departments
School of Civil Engineering
School of Mechanical Engineering
School of Electrical Engineering
School of Information Science and Technology
School of Economics and Management
School of Foreign Languages
School of Transportation and Logistics
School of Material Science and Engineering
School of Geological Science and Environmental Engineering
School of Architecture
School of Physical Science and Technology
School of Arts and Communications
School of Public Administration
School of Life Sciences and Engineering
School of Mechanics and Engineering
School of Mathematics
School of Political Science
SWJTU-Leeds Joint School
Center for Psychological Research and Counseling
Training Center for Modern Industrial Technology
Department of Physical Education
School of Mao Yisheng
School of Zhan Tianyou
Tangshan Research Institute

President Message 
SWJTU, located in Chengdu of Sichuan Province, shares with the region with a reputation for the glory of the place and land of abundance. With three campuses of 5000 acres in total size accommodating thousands of students, the university has turned into a higher institution covering engineering, science, humanities and law, etc. Throughout centenary operation, the university has long been adherent to the tradition of "Conscientious Scholarship and Stringent Requirement". Despite migrations of several times, the university has been practicing the mission of "Cultivating Talents; Engaging in Scholarship; Serving the Society; and Transmitting Culture". Well grounded, the university lays a solid foundation to dedicate itself for the revival of the country. Experiencing alternations and hardships, the university has shown great tenacity in overcoming difficulties on the road to progress. Proud of its engineering talents all across the land, the university has committed itself to the country through science and technology. Being passionate about railway, SWJTU has determined to build itself into a world-class research-oriented university.

Alumni
 Mao Yisheng: an expert on bridge construction and social activist.
 Tung-Yen Lin: structural engineer best known as the pioneer of standardizing the use of prestressed concrete.
 Jianyou Cao: One of the earliest contributors to Chinese railway electrification, a member of Chinese Academy of Sciences, and an expert in electric power system; the founder of the school of electrical engineering of Southwest Jiaotong University.

References

External links
 Official website

 
Universities and colleges in Chengdu
Jiaotong University
Project 211
Educational institutions established in 1896
1896 establishments in China